Aluminium toxicity in people on dialysis  is a problem for people on haemodialysis. The dialysis process does not efficiently remove excess aluminium from the body, so it may build up over time. Aluminium is a potentially toxic metal, and aluminium poisoning may lead to mainly three disorders: aluminium-induced bone disease, microcytic anemia and neurological dysfunction (encephalopathy). Such conditions are more prominently observed in people with chronic kidney failure and especially in people on haemodialysis.

About 5–10 mg of aluminium enters human body daily through different sources like water, food, occupational exposure to aluminium in industries, and so on. In people with normal kidney function, serum aluminium is normally lower than 6 microgram/L. Baseline levels of serum aluminium should be <20 microgram/L. According to AAMI, standard aluminum levels in the dialysis fluid should be less than 0.01 milligram/L.

References

Aluminium
Renal dialysis
Toxicology